The Oak Ridge Pioneers were a Minor League Baseball team that played in the Class C Mountain States League in 1954. They were located in Oak Ridge, Tennessee, and played their home games at Ridgeview Park. Bert Niehoff, a former Major League Baseball second baseman, served as the Pioneers' manager and general manager.

Oak Ridge lost its season opener on April 24 to the Maryville-Alcoa Twins, 6–1, before 2,800 people in attendance at Ridgeview Park. They won the next night on the road, defeating the Twins, 5–4. The Pioneers were one of three teams in the eight-team circuit still playing when the league disbanded on July 20. They compiled a win–loss record of 35–43 (.449), placing sixth out of seven teams, in their only season of competition.

References

External links
Statistics from Baseball-Reference

1954 establishments in Tennessee
1954 disestablishments in Tennessee
Baseball teams established in 1954
Baseball teams disestablished in 1954
Defunct baseball teams in Tennessee
Defunct Mountain States League (1948–1954) teams
Professional baseball teams in Tennessee
Oak Ridge, Tennessee